Michael Miao (born 13 July 1963) is a Taiwanese swimmer. He competed in two events at the 1984 Summer Olympics.

References

External links
 

1963 births
Living people
Taiwanese male swimmers
Olympic swimmers of Taiwan
Swimmers at the 1984 Summer Olympics
Place of birth missing (living people)
Harvard Crimson men's swimmers
Keck School of Medicine of USC alumni